The Tower of Pinareddu is a Genoese tower located in the commune of Zonza (Corse-du-Sud) on the east coast of the Corsica.

The tower was built in around 1595. It was one of a series of coastal defences constructed by the Republic of Genoa between 1530 and 1620 to stem the attacks by Barbary pirates. Genoese documents refer to the  Île de Pinarellu as the Isola dei Corsi or the Island of the Corsaires. The design of the Tower of Pinareddu is unusual in that the plan is square rather than round. The tower was attacked by the Ottoman Turks and burned in 1650.

Since 1981 the Tower of Pinareddu has been owned and maintained by the French government agency, the Conservatoire du littoral. Restoration work was carried out in 1994. In 1992 the tower was listed as one of the official historical monuments of France.

See also
List of Genoese towers in Corsica

References

External links
 Includes information on how to reach 90 towers and many photographs.

Towers in Corsica
Monuments historiques of Corsica